Glipostenoda shizuokana is a species of beetle in the genus Glipostenoda. It was described in 1935.

References

shizuokana
Beetles described in 1935
Taxa named by Hiromichi Kono